Charlie Cameron (24 March 1874 – 12 June 1936) was an Australian rules footballer who played with Fitzroy in the first year of Victorian Football League (VFL).

Sources

External links

Australian rules footballers from Victoria (Australia)
Fitzroy Football Club players
1874 births
1936 deaths
University of Melbourne alumni
Preston Football Club (VFA) players